Millboro is an unincorporated community in Tripp County, South Dakota, United States. Millboro is southwest of Colome.

Millboro was laid out in 1929, and named for a planned gristmill near the town site.

References

Unincorporated communities in Tripp County, South Dakota
Unincorporated communities in South Dakota